Montana Technological University, popularly known as Montana Tech, is a public university in Butte, Montana. Founded in 1900 as the Montana State School of Mines, the university became affiliated with the University of Montana in 1994. After undergoing several names changes, in 2017 the Montana University System Board of Regents voted to designate Montana Tech as part of Special Focus Four-Year Universities, the only such designation in the Montana University System. To recognize this new designation and the greater independence with it, the name was officially changed in 2018 from Montana Tech of the University of Montana to Montana Technological University. Montana Tech's focus is on engineering, applied and health science.

In fall 2017, Montana Tech had nearly 2,700 students, 13 campus buildings and offers 45 undergraduate degrees along with 15 minors, 11 certification degrees, and 10 pre-professional career programs. Montana Tech also offers 21 graduate degrees and has Ph.D. programs in Materials Science and Engineering and Earth Science and Engineering.

History
The Enabling Act of 1889 which brought Montana into the Union, allotted land for the creation of a school of mines as one of the four original Montana University System universities. In 1893 the Montana Legislature provided funding to establish the school in Butte. The cornerstone of Main Hall was laid in 1896, and the university opened its doors in 1900 as the Montana State School of Mines. The first student was a woman, Clara Clark of Butte, and Nathan R. Leonard acted as the first president. Despite enthusiastic local support, even offers of free land for construction, the early history of the school was fraught with poor funding and accusations of fraud, but with the help of former governor John E. Rickards, the school was opened.

In 1919 the Montana Legislature established the Montana State Bureau of Mines and Metallurgy on the campus in keeping with Montana Tech as a school focusing on the development of minerals and industry. Charles H. Clapp of the mining department served as the first president of the Bureau.

The school was renamed the Montana College of Mineral Science and Technology in 1965. The school begins moving beyond purely engineering and applied sciences, adding social science and liberal arts options. Alumni Coliseum opens on campus.

The university became affiliated with the University of Montana in 1994 with a reorganization of the Montana University System. The name was changed to Montana Tech of the University of Montana. The Butte Vocational-Technical Center was put under Montana Tech administration as the College of Technology. In 1998 Frank Gilmore becomes chancellor.

In 2010 the Natural Resource Building (NRB) opened which now accommodates the Bureau of Mines and the Petroleum Engineering Department. In 2011 Don Blackketter becomes chancellor. In 2012 the College of Technology becomes Highlands College, and Frank and Ann Gilmore University Relations Center (URC) building is opened on campus. The first Ph.D. program in Materials Science and Engineering began in 2014 in partnership with University of Montana and Montana State University. The Nursing Department began offering a full bachelor's degree in 2015. In October 2021, the university announced a $7M donation to the Nursing Department from Dave and Sherry Lesar. This led to the re-naming of the Nursing Department as the Sherry Lesar School or Nursing. These funds also contributed to the construction of the Lesar Family Nursing Simulation Center which opened in the spring of 2022 in the Science & Engineering building. In 2016, a full Bachelor's of Mechanical Engineering program was added, and the Natural Resource Research Center opens on campus including a new nano research lab, and additional lab space for existing departments.

In 2017 the Montana Board of Regents designated Montana Tech as part of Special Focus Four-Year Universities, the only such designation in the Montana University System, in recognition of Tech's focus on engineering, applied science and health science. This change gives greater independence by reporting directly to the Board of Regents and handling its own finances instead of through the University of Montana. To recognize this, in the summer of 2018, the school's name was changed to Montana Technological University. Les Cook became chancellor in 2019.

Presidents (1900-1994) and chancellors (1994-present) 

 Nathan R. Leonard, 1900 - 1909
 Charles H. Bowman, 1909 - 1919
 Charles H. Clapp, 1919 - 1921
 George Warren Craven, 1921 - 1928
 Francis Andrew Thomson, 1928 - 1950
 J. Robert Van Pelt, 1951 - 1956
 Edwin G. Koch, 1957 - 1971
 Fred W. DeMoney, 1972 - 1985
 Lindsay Norman Jr., 1986 - 1998
 Frank Gilmore, 1998 - 2011
 Don Blackketter, 2011 - 2019
 Les Cook, 2019–present

Academics
Montana Technological University offers approximately 45 undergraduate degrees along with over 15 minors, 11 certification degrees, and 10 pre-professional career programs. Montana Tech also offers 13 graduate degrees including two Ph.D. programs in Materials Science and Engineering and Earth Science and Engineering.

Montana Tech consists of four colleges: the School of Mines & Engineering; the College of Letters, Sciences and Professional Studies; Highlands College; and the Graduate School.

Athletics
The Montana Tech athletic teams are called the Orediggers, named after Butte's mining history. The university is a member of the National Association of Intercollegiate Athletics (NAIA), primarily competing in the Frontier Conference since the 1933–34 academic year.

Montana Tech competes in 12 intercollegiate varsity sports: Men's sports include basketball, cross country, football, golf and track & field (indoor and outdoor); while women's sports include basketball, cross country, golf, track & field (indoor and outdoor) and volleyball.

Football 

The Orediggers football team won the Frontier Conference Championship in ’36, ’39, ’70, ’72, ’79, ’83, ’92, ’96, ’97, ’04, '12, ’15, and ’16. They were runner-ups in the 1996 NAIA National Championship under coach Bob Green.

Basketball 
Head coach Adam Hiatt and the Orediggers men's basketball team won the 2021-22 Frontier Conference regular season and tournament championships. They set school records for most overall wins (27-7), conference wins (13-2), first NAIA National Tournament win, first NAIA national ranking (#14), and four consecutive winning seasons. Sindou Diallo was named 1st Team all-conference and 2nd Team all-American. Caleb Bellach was named 1st Team all-conference and Honorable Mention all-American. Taylor England was named 2nd Team all-conference, marking the 4th consecutive year of all-conference honors. Derrius Collins was the Frontier Conference Defensive Player of the Year and Keeley Bake the Frontier Conference 6th Man of the Year. The Orediggers won the Frontier Conference regular season championships in '83, '84, '85, '88, '91, '93, '22, and conference tournament championships in ‘83, ‘84, ‘85, ‘88, ‘93, ‘98, ‘99, and ‘22. The Orediggers beat rival Carroll College 62–61 on February 28, 2022 to win their first Frontier Conference championship since 1999.

Track and field 
Montana Tech began participating in the NAIA as the Orediggers track and field team started in spring 2021 with Zach Kughn as head coach. Becca Richtman won the 3000m steeplechase at the 2021 NAIA Outdoor Championship. At the 2022 NAIA Indoor Championship, Richtman won the 1 mile and 3000m races, and was named meet MVP. The Orediggers finished 6th overall. At the 2022 NAIA Outdoor Championship, Richtman won the 10,000 meter race, took 2nd in the 5,000 meter, 2nd in the 3,000 meter, was named meet MVP, and named the NAIA National Women’s Track Athlete of the Year. Over her career Richtman won 10 All-American honors.

Golf 
Sean Benson won Frontier Conference Men's Golf Championship in 2019. Sean Ramsbacher won the Men's Conference Championship in 2021, no tournament was held in 2020.

Reputation and rankings
In 2014, Montana Tech was ranked sixth in the nation for graduates earning the highest starting salaries, according to the Washington Post. The following year, The Wall Street Journal ranked Montana Tech ninth in the nation for best public universities for return on investment.

Montana Tech has had 1 Fulbright Scholar, 2 Rhodes Scholar finalists, 9 Goldwater Scholars and 5 Goldwater honorable mentions.

Notable alumni
 Amanda Curtis, member of the Montana House of Representatives
 Jim Deming, football coach
 Craig Kupp, former NFL player. He transferred after his freshman season
Ryan Lance, CEO of ConocoPhillips

See also
 Missoula College

Notes

References

Further reading
 25 Statutes at Large, 676; 1 Supp. Rev. St. U.S. pp. 645, 648.
 Laws of 1893; Section 1572, Political Code of Montana
 Laws of 1895; Sections 1591, 1594, 1595, 1600, Political Code of Montana
 McGlynn, Terrence D. Montana Tech 1893-1984.  Butte, MT:  Montana Tech Foundation, 1984.
 Munday, Pat. Biographical entry for C.H. Clapp (1883-1935), geologist and Montana School of Mines President. American National Biography, ed. John A. Garraty and Mark C. Carnes, 24 vols. (Oxford University Press: 1999): v. 4, pp. 900–1.

External links

 
 Official athletics website

Buildings and structures in Butte, Montana
Education in Silver Bow County, Montana
Universities and colleges accredited by the Northwest Commission on Colleges and Universities
University of Montana System
Frontier Conference
1889 establishments in Montana
Schools of mines in the United States
Technological universities in the United States
Tourist attractions in Butte, Montana
Public universities and colleges in Montana